Põltsamaa is a rural municipality of Estonia, in Jõgeva County. It has a population of 2722 (2001) and an area of 416.9 km² (161.0 mi²).

Populated places
Põltsamaa Parish has one town, 3 small boroughs, and around 60 villages.

 Towns
Põltsamaa

 Small boroughs
Adavere - Kamari - Puurmani

 Villages
Aidu - Alastvere - Altnurga - Annikvere - Arisvere - Esku - Jüriküla - Kaavere - Kablaküla - Kalana - Kaliküla - Kalme - Kauru - Kirikuvalla - Kõpu - Kõrkküla - Kose - Kuningamäe - Kuris - Laasme - Lahavere - Lebavere - Loopre - Luige - Lustivere - Mällikvere - Mõhküla - Mõisaküla - Mõrtsi - Neanurme - Nõmavere - Nurga - Pajusi - Pauastvere - Pikknurme - Pilu - Pisisaare - Pudivere - Puduküla - Puiatu - Räsna - Rõstla - Sopimetsa - Sulustvere - Tammiku - Tapiku - Tõivere - Tõrenurme - Tõrve - Umbusi - Uuevälja - Vägari - Väike-Kamari - Väljataguse - Vitsjärve - Võhmanõmme - Võisiku - Vorsti

Religion

References

External links